Sugarloaf (also spelled Sugar Loaf) is an unincorporated community and a census-designated place (CDP) located in and governed by Boulder County, Colorado, United States. The CDP is a part of the Boulder, CO Metropolitan Statistical Area. The population of the Sugarloaf CDP was 261 at the United States Census 2010. The Boulder post office (Zip Code 80302) serves the area.

History
Sugarloaf, sometimes spelled Sugar Loaf, Boulder County, was referred to in Colorado historical records dating back to 1868.  It seems the early name came from a mining claim referred to as "Sugar Loaf, near Yellow Pine."
Sugar Loaf seems also to have been a term for a mining district, of multiple mining claims.

The Black Tiger Fire"was the worst wildland fire loss in Colorado history" at the time.  It was a human-caused fire that started 9 July 1989 in a scenic mountain area at the base of Black Tiger Gulch and swept up to the summit of Sugarloaf Mountain through residential areas that were "nestled among the trees.  Within the first five to six hours after ignition, 44 homes and other structures were destroyed and many others were damaged."  Some fire fighters of the Sugarloaf Volunteer Fire Department had their own homes destroyed during the fire.  Although there were a number of minor injuries, there were no fatalities from the fire.

Geography 
Sugarloaf is located in south-central Boulder County, approximately halfway between Boulder and Nederland. It is bordered by the Mountain Meadows CDP to the northeast, and North Boulder Creek forms part of the southern edge of the community. Sugarloaf Road is the main route through the CDP.

Demographics

Town organizations and events 
The VFD was initially formed in 1967, and in 2019, serves approximately 1400 persons.

See also

Outline of Colorado
Index of Colorado-related articles
State of Colorado
Colorado cities and towns
Colorado census designated places
Colorado counties
Boulder County, Colorado
Colorado metropolitan areas
Front Range Urban Corridor
North Central Colorado Urban Area
Denver-Aurora-Boulder, CO Combined Statistical Area
Boulder, CO Metropolitan Statistical Area

References

External links

Sugar Loaf Fire Protection District
Sugarloaf Mining District
Boulder County website

Census-designated places in Boulder County, Colorado
Census-designated places in Colorado
Denver metropolitan area